Michael Muhney (born June 12, 1975) is an American actor. His best known roles include Sheriff Don Lamb on the UPN/The CW television series Veronica Mars between 2004 and 2007 and Adam Newman on the CBS daytime soap opera The Young and the Restless from 2009 to 2014.

Early life
Muhney was born in Chicago and raised in Euless, Texas from the age of eight. When he was 16 years old, he won the state championship for his One-Act play performance while attending Trinity High School. He moved back to Chicago where he earned a bachelor's degree from The Theatre School at DePaul University in 1997. He is a member of Mensa. He also speaks two other languages, German and American Sign Language (ASL).

Career

The Young and the Restless
In May 2009, after Chris Engen left the role of Adam Newman, Muhney was hired as a recast. He made his debut on the episode dated June 25, 2009. In 2011, Muhney signed a contract that would keep him in the role for an unspecified period. In April 2013, Muhney announced that he had signed a new contract that would expire in June 2015. In December, however, Muhney announced that he had been abruptly let go from the soap opera, with his last airdate on January 30, 2014.

After the sudden announcement that Muhney had been fired from the role in December 2013, viewers and critics alike expressed their disappointment in the decision. Michael Ausiello of TVLine wrote that the news was the "worst Christmas present ever", as well as Jamey Giddens of Zap2it writing: "Outspoken and insanely-gifted, Michael Muhney has definitely shaken things up in daytime since joining The Young and the Restless. Whether he was demanding changes in the Daytime Emmy nomination process, or getting into fights with his TV pappy on Twitter, one thing was for certain — Muhney always brought it on screen as bad seed Adam Newman. Well, not anymore." Immediately after the news of his firing, Muhney conducted an interview with the Huffington Post and stated: "Part of me feels this is because I've always been outspoken, and sometimes I've been too outspoken. Sometimes I've walked around with a big backpack full of hubris. That is entirely on me. CBS, Sony, and Jill Phelps are not to blame for that." Muhney also said that the writers were planning to "take a break from Adam for 3 to 6 months" and then recast the role.

In January 2014, celebrity tabloid TMZ reported that Muhney was allegedly let go from the soap was because Muhney had sexually harassed co-star Hunter King (who portrays Summer Newman). The rumor generated significant negative publicity for the soap opera; Margaret Eby of the New York Daily News wrote, "The set of The Young and the Restless may have turned into a real life soap opera thanks to star Michael Muhney..." Fox News reported that several viewers were upset by Muhney's firing and the sexual harassment allegations, writing: "Many Y&R fans were none too pleased to find out Muhney was leaving, and several blasted the allegations." TMZ later reported that angered viewers had paid US$785 to have an airplane fly over CBS Studios in Los Angeles with a banner to have Muhney rehired, and the plane flew three days later. In August 2014, Muhney wrote on Twitter that the rumours were false and baseless.

Filmography

Awards and nominations

References

External links 
 
 

1975 births
Male actors from Chicago
DePaul University alumni
Living people
People from Euless, Texas
Mensans
Male actors from Texas
20th-century American male actors
21st-century American male actors
American male television actors
American male film actors